Squalene monooxygenase (also called squalene epoxidase) is a eukaryotic enzyme that uses NADPH and diatomic oxygen to oxidize squalene to 2,3-oxidosqualene (squalene epoxide).  Squalene epoxidase catalyzes the first oxygenation step in sterol biosynthesis and is thought to be one of the rate-limiting enzymes in this pathway.  In humans, squalene epoxidase is encoded by the SQLE gene.
Several eukaryote genomes lack a squalene monooxygenase encoding gene, but instead encode an alternative squalene epoxidase that performs the same task.

Mechanism 
The canonical squalene monooxygenase is a flavoprotein monooxygenase. Flavoprotein monooxygenase form flavin hydroperoxides at the enzyme active site, which then transfer the terminal oxygen atom of the hydroperoxide to the substrate. Squalene monooxygenase differs from other flavin monooxygenases in that the oxygen is inserted into the substrate as an epoxide rather than as a hydroxyl group. This enzyme contains a loosely bound FAD flavin and obtains electrons from NADPH-cytochrome P450 reductase, rather than binding NADPH directly. The alternative squalene epoxidase belongs to the fatty acid hydroxylase superfamily and obtains electrons from cytochrome b5.

Inhibitors 
Inhibitors of squalene epoxidase have found application mainly as antifungal drugs:

 butenafine
 naftifine
 terbinafine

Since squalene epoxidase is on the biosynthetic pathway leading to cholesterol, inhibitors of this enzyme may also find application in treatment of hypercholesterolemia.

Localization 

In baker's yeast (Saccharomyces cerevisiae), squalene epoxidase is localized to both the endoplasmic reticulum and lipid droplets. Only the ER localized protein is active.

Additional products

Squalene epoxidase also catalyzes the formation of diepoxysqualene (DOS). DOS is converted to 24(S),25-epoxylanosterol by lanosterol synthase.

Model organisms 

Model organisms have been used in the study of SQLE function. A conditional knockout mouse line called Sqletm1a(EUCOMM)Wtsi was generated at the Wellcome Trust Sanger Institute. Male and female animals underwent a standardized phenotypic screen to determine the effects of deletion. Additional screens performed:  - In-depth immunological phenotyping

See also 
 Antifungal drug#Allylamines

References

Further reading

External links 
 

EC 1.14.13